Grand Prix de Littérature Américaine (American Literature Grand Prize) is a French literary award given each year to an American novel translated into French and published in that year starting January 1. The first award was in 2015. The award was created by the bookseller and publisher . The jury consists of nine members: three literary critics, three publishers and three booksellers.

Honorees
Blue ribbon = winner. Book titles are of the original American publication, not the French title or its translation.

2015

The winner was announced November 8, 2015.

 Laird Hunt, Neverhome

2016

The winner was announced November 8, 2016.

 Atticus Lish, Preparation for the Next Life
Eddie Joyce, Small Mercies 
Molly Prentiss, Tuesday Nights in 1980

2017

The winner was announced November 13, 2017.

Vivian Cornick, Fierce Attachments
Christian Kiefer, The Animals
 Richard Russo, Everybody's Fool

2018

The winner was announced November 12, 2018.

Dan Chaon, Ill Will
Rachel Kushner, The Mars Room
 Richard Powers, The Overstory

References

Awards established in 2015
2015 establishments in France
French fiction awards